The 2007–08 GET-ligaen season began on 13 September 2007 and was scheduled to end 21 February 2008. The Storhamar Dragons won the championships for the sixth time. The win also marked the fourth championship in as many leap years for the Dragons (1996, 2000, 2004, 2008).

Regular season

Final standings
GP = Games played; W = Wins; L = Losses; T = Ties; OTW = Overtime Wins; OTL = Overtime losses; GF = Goals for; GA = Goals against; PTS = PointsSource: hockey.no

Statistics

Scoring leaders
GP = Games played; G = Goals; A = Assists; Pts = Points; +/– = Plus/minus; PIM = Penalty minutesSource: hockey.no

Leading goaltenders
GP = Games played; TOI = Time on ice (minutes); W = Wins; L = Losses; GA = Goals against; SO = Shutouts; Sv% = Save percentage; GAA = Goals against averageSource: hockey.no

Attendance

Playoff

Source: hockey.no

The deciding game was played at Hamar OL-Amfi

The Storhamar Dragons goaltender Ruben Smith was named the playoffs MVP.

Promotion/Relegation
GP = Games played; W = Wins; L = Losses; T = Ties; OTW = Overtime Wins; OTL = Overtime losses; GF = Goals for; GA = Goals against; PTS = PointsSource: hockey.no

References

External links
 

GET-ligaen seasons
Norway
GET